Arklow railway station is a railway station in Arklow, County Wicklow, Ireland.

History
The station opened on 16 November 1863.

Opened by the Dublin and South Eastern Railway the station was part of the Great Southern & Western Railway then absorbed into Great Southern Railways by the Railways (Great Southern) Preliminary Amalgamation Scheme of 12 November 1924.

The station passed to CIÉ as a result of the Transport Act, 1944 which took effect from 1 January 1945, then to Iarnród Éireann on 2 February 1987.

As with other stations between Wicklow and Rosslare Europort, semaphore signalling and ETS operation ceased here in April 2008. A colour-light signal existed here in semaphore days, having been installed in 1977.

Accidents and incidents
On 3 October 1979, a passenger train and a freight train were involved in a head-on collision. Twenty-nine people were injured.

Description
Waiting facilities include three covered shelters, one on platform 1 and two on platform 2. There is a waiting room next to the ticket office in the station building on platform 1.  A pay-and-display car park is in the former goods yard, with capacity for 150 vehicles and a covered bicycle parking area.

The station is staffed full-time.

It has two platforms, one on the passing loop.

Services/routes

The service from the station is:

Monday to Friday
5 trains per day to Dublin Connolly (one continuing to Dundalk Clarke)
4 trains per day to Rosslare Europort
1 train per day to Wexford O'Hanrahan

Saturdays
4 trains per day to Dublin Connolly (one continuing to Dundalk Clarke)
3 trains per day to Rosslare Europort

Sundays
3 trains per day to Dublin Connolly
3 trains per day to Rosslare Europort

Transport 
TFI Local Link (Carlow Kilkenny Wicklow division) bus route 800 operates to Carlow IT from the station 4 times a day (3 on Sundays). Additionally, a number of Bus Éireann bus routes stop at Main Street, which is located 500 m from the station.

See also
 List of railway stations in Ireland

References

Sources

External links 

Irish Rail webpage of Arklow station
Facebook page of Arklow station

Iarnród Éireann stations in County Wicklow
Railway stations in County Wicklow
Railway stations opened in 1863
Arklow